B0 may refer to:
 , a net magnetisation vector in medical imaging
 B0 star, a subclass of B-class stars
 Pininfarina B0, an electric car
 A paper size
 The neutral B meson in particle physics
 B-0 : a code name for the FLOW-MATIC compiler
La Compagnie, a French airline (IATA code B0)

See also
Bo (disambiguation)